Versoix railway station is a railway station in the municipality of Versoix, in the Swiss canton of Geneva. It is an intermediate stop on the standard gauge Lausanne–Geneva line of Swiss Federal Railways.

Services 
The following services stop at Versoix:

References

External links 
 
 

Railway stations in the canton of Geneva
Swiss Federal Railways stations